Bulgarian-Romanian relations are foreign relations between Bulgaria and Romania. Bulgaria has an embassy in Bucharest. Romania has an embassy in Sofia and three honorary consulates (in Burgas, Silistra and Vidin). There are 7,336  Bulgarians who are living in Romania and around 4,575 Romanians living in Bulgaria.
The countries share 608 km of common borders, mostly along the Danube. Both countries are full members of the European Union and NATO.
The two countries joined NATO in 2004 and then the European Union in 2007.

History

Bulgarian relations with Romania feature regular official visits by the two presidents. Romanian-Bulgarian relations are developing "very intensively" because of EU accession, since Romania and Bulgaria both joined the European Union in 2007. In the first half of the 20th century, Romania and Bulgaria had a serious conflict over the Dobruja region. This dispute, while now largely forgotten, escalated into all out war in 1913. The territorial dispute between the two countries ended with the Treaty of Craiova.

During the 20th century, Bulgaria and Romania fought in the side of the German Empire and Nazi Germany during the two world wars. Both countries became communist states under the influence of the Soviet Union but Romania formally left the sphere in 1964. The communist regimes collapsed in 1989.

There are close relations between Ruse and Giurgiu which have one of the two bridges on the Danube in the section shared by the two countries, the Danube Bridge. The other bridge is the New Europe Bridge located between Vidin and Calafat, its construction was completed in June, 2013.

2019 African swine fever controversy
A diplomatic row broke out in August 2019 between Bulgaria and Romania over the African swine fever (ASF).

The Bulgarian Prime Minister, Boyko Borisov, accused Romanian tourists of bringing the ASF disease and helping to spread it. Borisov is reported to have said: "There are 57,000 cars crossing from Romania each day into Bulgaria. I’m sure the Romanian tourists brought the disease. They eat on the side of the road, throw the food remains that help spread the swine disease. They are walking around, eating and throwing the remains all over the place. There’s nothing we can do."

The Romanian foreign ministry replied that it was disappointed by Borisov's words and that Romanian tourists boost Bulgaria's GDP: "Beyond the technical arguments that will be offered by the National Veterinary Health and Food Safety Authority to respond to the unfortunate statements of the prime minister of Bulgaria, Boyko Borisov, we are surprised and disappointed by the way the Bulgarian prime minister has referred to Romanian tourists, who make a substantial contribution to the GDP of Bulgaria"

Gallery

Resident diplomatic missions
 Bulgaria has an embassy in Bucharest. 
 Romania has an embassy in Sofia.

See also 
 Foreign relations of Bulgaria
 Foreign relations of Romania
 Bulgaria–Romania border
 Bulgarians in Romania
 Romanians in Bulgaria
 Craiova Group
 2007 enlargement of the European Union
 Union of Bulgaria and Romania
 Population exchange between Bulgaria and Romania

References

External links

  Bulgarian embassy in Bucharest
  Romanian embassy in Sofia

 
Romania 
Bilateral relations of Romania